The 2019 OEC Kaohsiung was a professional tennis tournament played on hard courts. It was the eighth edition of the tournament which was part of the 2019 ATP Challenger Tour. It took place in Kaohsiung, Taiwan between 16 and 22 September 2019.

Singles main-draw entrants

Seeds

 1 Rankings are as of 9 September 2019.

Other entrants
The following players received wildcards into the singles main draw:
  Ray Ho
  Hsieh Cheng-peng
  Hsu Yu-hsiou
  Lo Chien-hsun
  Yu Cheng-yu

The following player received entry into the singles main draw using a protected ranking:
  Miliaan Niesten

The following players received entry from the qualifying draw:
  Yusuke Takahashi
  Jumpei Yamasaki

The following players received entry as lucky losers:
  Lee Kuan-yi
  Tsai Chang-lin

Champions

Singles

 John Millman def.  Marc Polmans 6–4, 6–2.

Doubles

 Hsieh Cheng-peng /  Yang Tsung-hua def.  Evan King /  Hunter Reese 6–4, 7–6(7–4).

References

2019
2019 ATP Challenger Tour
2019 in Taiwanese tennis
September 2019 sports events in Asia